Kalimati is a rural municipality located in Salyan District of Karnali Province of Nepal.

Demographics
At the time of the 2011 Nepal census, Kalimati Rural Municipality had a population of 23,005. Of these, 96.9% spoke Nepali, 2.6% Magar, 0.3% Raute and 0.2% other languages as their first language.

In terms of ethnicity/caste, 40.8% were Chhetri, 34.6% Magar, 10.7% Kami, 3.9% Sanyasi/Dasnami, 3.6% Damai/Dholi, 3.3% Hill Brahmin, 1.2% Sarki, 0.6% Kumal, 0.4% Badi and 0.9% others.

In terms of religion, 95.7% were Hindu, 2.8% Buddhist, 1.4% Christian and 0.1% others.

References

External links
 Official website

Populated places in Salyan District, Nepal
Rural municipalities in Karnali Province
Rural municipalities of Nepal established in 2017